It's All Around You is the fifth studio album by American post-rock band Tortoise. It was released on Thrill Jockey in 2004.

Critical reception
At Metacritic, which assigns a weighted average score out of 100 to reviews from mainstream critics, the album received an average score of 68% based on 31 reviews, indicating "generally favorable reviews".

In 2011, American rapper Currensy named it one of his 25 favorite albums, stating: "I don’t do major drugs, but it was an acid trip in audio form."

Track listing

Charts

References

External links
 

2004 albums
Tortoise (band) albums
Thrill Jockey albums